Matunuck is a village in South Kingstown, Rhode Island, United States near Charlestown, Rhode Island.  The village is located on a point along the southern Atlantic coast of Rhode Island off U.S. Route 1.  The village takes its name from a Native American word meaning "lookout".  The Narragansett tribe made a summer encampment at this location before the land was sold to colonists as part of the Pettaquamscutt purchase.

Geography and attractions

The area is home to several notable beaches including Moonstone Beach, South Kingstown Town Beach at Matunuck, East Matunuck State Beach, and Roy Carpenter's Beach and cottages. Matunuck (Deep Hole) area is known for world class surfing, board to boat, several zones for all types of surfing craft, conditions, and being a low profile area.  The well-known Theatre-by-the-Sea playhouse is also in Matunuck and is listed on the National Register of Historic Places.

External links
 
 "Perry good time" by Paul E. Kandarian, The Boston Globe, March 18, 2008

Villages in Washington County, Rhode Island
Villages in Rhode Island